Brigalow Creek is a creek in north west New South Wales, Australia. The headwaters are located south of Mount Jerrybang at  where the elevation is 427 metres and the creek finishes by flowing into Tycannah Creek, north of the village of Terry Hie Hie at an elevation of 271 metres and at coordinates . The creek's overall length is 21.7 kilometres and loses 166 metres of elevation over this distance.

References

Rivers of New South Wales
Murray-Darling basin